Ionuţ Laurian Tîrnăcop (born 22 April 1987) is a Romanian former professional football player who played as a midfielder.

Career
Tîrnăcop started playing football when he was eight years old at Chimia, a team from his home town, Turnu Măgurele. When he was fifteen, he made his debut in Liga III with another local team, Turris Turnu Măgurele. One year later he joined Rulmentul Alexandria and in 2004 he moved to the Marius Lăcătuș football school.

In 2005, Tîrnăcop was transferred to Sportul Studențesc where he spent five years before debuting in Liga I in a match against FC Timișoara. In August 2011, he scored his first goal in the first Romanian league against CFR Cluj. At the beginning of 2012, he missed a transfer to the Liga I side, Petrolul Ploiești but, in November 2012, he joined FC Bihor as a free agent.

In April 2013, he was brought to Universitatea Cluj by the manager of the team at that time, Ioan Viorel Ganea, and scored the first goal for his new team in a match against Ceahlăul Piatra Neamț.

In September 2014, he signed a contract with Universitatea Craiova.

References

External links
 Profile on Universitatea Cluj official site
 

1987 births
Living people
People from Turnu Măgurele
Romanian footballers
Association football midfielders
Liga I players
Liga II players
FC Sportul Studențesc București players
FC Bihor Oradea players
FC Universitatea Cluj players
CS Universitatea Craiova players